Võtikvere Nature Reserve is a nature reserve which is located in Jõgeva County, Estonia.

The area of the nature reserve is 117 ha.

The protected area was founded in 2005 to protect valuable type of habitats and threatened species in Võtikvere village (Torma Parish).

References

Nature reserves in Estonia
Geography of Jõgeva County